Óscar Díaz (born 22 October 1985) is a Bolivian football striker who currently plays for Club Real Potosí.

References

1985 births
Living people
People from Tarija
Bolivian footballers
Bolivia international footballers
Municipal Real Mamoré players
Club San José players
Club Blooming players
Club Aurora players
C.D. Jorge Wilstermann players
Sport Boys Warnes players
The Strongest players
Universitario de Sucre footballers
Royal Pari F.C. players
Club Real Potosí players
Bolivian Primera División players
Association football forwards